Events from the year 1806 in Germany.

Incumbents

Holy Roman Empire
 Francis II (5 July 17926 August 1806)

Kingdoms 
 Kingdom of Prussia
 Monarch – Frederick William III of Prussia (16 November 17977 June 1840)
 Kingdom of Bavaria
 Maximilian I (1 January 180613 October 1825)
 Kingdom of Saxony
 Frederick Augustus I (20 December 18065 May 1827)
 Kingdom of Württemberg
 Frederick I (22 December 179730 October 1816)

Grand Duchies 
 Grand Duke of Baden
 Charles Frederick (25 July 180610 June 1811)
 Grand Duke of Hesse
 Louis I (14 August 18066 April 1830)
 Grand Duke of Mecklenburg-Schwerin
 Frederick Francis I (24 April 17851 February 1837)
 Grand Duke of Mecklenburg-Strelitz
 Charles II (2 June 17946 November 1816)
 Grand Duke of Oldenburg
 Wilhelm (6 July 17852 July 1823) Due to mental illness, Wilhelm was duke in name only, with his cousin Peter, Prince-Bishop of Lübeck, acting as regent throughout his entire reign.
 Peter I (2 July 182321 May 1829)
 Grand Duke of Saxe-Weimar
 Karl August  (1758–1809) Raised to grand duchy in 1809

Principalities 
 Schaumburg-Lippe
 George William (13 February 17871860)
 Schwarzburg-Rudolstadt
 Louis Frederick II (13 April 179328 April 1807)
 Schwarzburg-Sondershausen
 Günther Friedrich Karl I (14 October 179419 August 1835)
 Principality of Lippe
 Leopold II (5 November 18021 January 1851)
 Principality of Reuss-Greiz
 Heinrich XIII (28 June 180029 January 1817)
 Waldeck and Pyrmont
 Friedrich Karl August  (29 August 176324 September 1812)

Duchies 
 Duke of Anhalt-Dessau
 Leopold III (16 December 17519 August 1817)
 Duke of Brunswick
 Frederick William (16 October 180616 June 1815)
 Duke of Saxe-Altenburg
 Duke of Saxe-Hildburghausen (1780–1826)  - Frederick
 Duke of Saxe-Coburg and Gotha
 Ernest I (9 December 180612 November 1826)
 Duke of Saxe-Meiningen
 Bernhard II (24 December 180320 September 1866)
 Duke of Schleswig-Holstein-Sonderburg-Beck
 Frederick Charles Louis (24 February 177525 March 1816)

Events 
 1 January – The Kingdom of Bavaria is established by Napoleon.
 12 July – Sixteen German Imperial States leave the Holy Roman Empire and form the Confederation of the Rhine; Liechtenstein is given full sovereignty, leading to the collapse of the Empire after 844 years.
 6 August – Francis II, the last Holy Roman Emperor, abdicates, thus ending the Holy Roman Empire after about a millennium.
 25 September – Prussia issues an ultimatum to Paris, threatening war if France does not halt marching its troops through Prussian territory to reach Austria; the message does not reach Napoleon Bonaparte until 7 October, and he responds by attacking Prussia.
 8 October – Napoleon responds to the 25 September ultimatum from Prussia, and begins the War of the Fourth Coalition; Prussia is joined by Saxony and other minor German states.
 9 October – Battle of Schleiz: French and Prussian forces fight for the first time since the war began.  The Prussian army is easily defeated, by a more numerous French force.
 10 October – Battle of Saalfeld
 14 October – Battle of Jena–Auerstedt: Napoleon defeats the Prussian army of Prince Hohenlohe at Jena, while Marshal Davout defeats the main Prussian army under Charles William Ferdinand, Duke of Brunswick-Wolfenbüttel, who is killed.
 16 October – Capitulation of Erfurt
 17 October – Battle of Halle
 24 October – French forces enter Berlin.
 25 October8 November – Siege of Magdeburg
 28 October – Battle of Prenzlau
 29 October – Capitulation of Pasewalk
 30 October –  Capitulation of Stettin: Believing themselves massively outnumbered, the 5,300-man garrison at Stettin in Prussia surrenders to a much smaller French force without a fight.
 1 November – Battle of Waren-Nossentin
 6 November –  Battle of Lübeck
 7–22 November – Siege of Hamelin
 21 November – Berlin Decree

Births 
 1 January – Lionel Kieseritzky, Baltic-German chess player (died 1853)
 13 January – Eugen Napoleon Neureuther, German painter and illustrator (died 1882)
 18 February – Eduard Heis, German mathematician and astronomer (died 1877)
 6 April – Friedrich Wilhelm Ritschl, German scholar (died 1876)
 12 June – John Augustus Roebling, German-American engineer (died 1869)
 22 July – Johann Kaspar Zeuss, German historian and philologist (died 1856)

 25 October – Max Stirner, German philosopher (died 1856)
 23 November – Philipp Hoffmann, German architect and builder (died 1869)
 11 December – Otto Wilhelm Hermann von Abich, German geologist (died 1886)

Deaths 
 6 January – Jean Henri Riesener, German furniture designer (born 1734)
 3 March – Heinrich Christian Boie, German poet and editor (born 1744)
 23 August – Johann Eleazar Zeissig, German genre, portrait and porcelain painter, and engraver (born 1737)
 10 October – Therese Maron, German painter active in Rome (born 1725)
 10 October – Louis Ferdinand of Prussia, German prince (killed in battle) (born 1772)

Date unknown 
 Johann Gottfried Arnold, German cellist (born 1773)

References 

Years of the 19th century in Germany
 
Germany
Germany